Sir William Austin Zeal  (5 December 1830 – 11 March 1912) was an Australian railway engineer and politician, Senator for Victoria in the Parliament of Australia.

Zeal was born at Westbury, Wiltshire, England, the son of Thomas Zeal, a wine merchant, and Ann, nee Greenland. Educated privately, Zeal obtained his diploma as a surveyor and engineer, and came to Melbourne in 1852. Employed as an engineer in charge of railway construction by private contractors, Zeal was also employed in the government service for some years. In 1864, he was elected to Victorian Legislative Assembly as one of the three members for the seat of Castlemaine.

During his campaign for election, Zeal strongly criticised the ability of the Victorian Railways engineer-in-chief, Thomas Higinbotham. In 1865, a select committee of the Victorian Parliament was set up to investigate Higinbotham's claim that Zeal had exaggerated the extent of his experience, and his implication that Zeal had acted corruptly when dealing with private railway construction contractors Cornish and Bruce, whom Zeal left the government service to work for. The committee exonerated Zeal.

Having joined forces with Sir William Mitchell in a station in the Riverina, Zeal resigned his seat in December 1865. Drought conditions caused him to resume his practice as an engineer in 1869, including the design of the Moama-Deniliquin railway. In 1871, he was again elected for Castlemaine, but the pressure of business caused him to resign in 1874.

In 1882, he entered the Victorian Legislative Council as a representative of the North Central Province and, in April 1892, he became Postmaster-General in the Shiels ministry. He resigned in November and was elected president of the Legislative Council. Zeal was re-elected to that position in 1894, 1897 and 1900, and was one of the representatives of Victoria at the 1897 federal convention that worked towards federation of the six Australian colonies.

At the first federal election in 1901, Zeal was elected to the Australian Senate as a Protectionist Party representative for Victoria. In 1906, then in his seventy-sixth year, he declined to stand due to age concerns.

Zeal was a director of several leading Melbourne financial companies and retained his interest in them until his death, following an operation, in 1912. Created KCMG in 1895, Zeal never married.

References

Further reading
 
 

1830 births
1912 deaths
Australian civil engineers
Engineers from Melbourne
Politicians from Melbourne
Members of the Australian Senate
Members of the Australian Senate for Victoria
Australian Knights Commander of the Order of St Michael and St George
Australian politicians awarded knighthoods
Members of the Victorian Legislative Assembly
Members of the Victorian Legislative Council
Presidents of the Victorian Legislative Council
Burials in Victoria (Australia)
Protectionist Party members of the Parliament of Australia
20th-century Australian politicians
English emigrants to colonial Australia